The Criminal Investigation Department (CID) is one of the many departments under the Singapore Police Force for premier investigation and staff authority for criminal investigation matters within the Singapore Police Force.

It is led by the Director of CID and assisted by 3 Deputy Directors. CID has a staff of over 500 officers: Senior Investigation Officers, Investigation Officers, Police Officers and Civilian Officers.

Overview
The CID conducts inquiries into a variety of criminal offences in Singapore, and is empowered to make arrests. Recent high profile investigations include the death of Shane Todd in 2013. The present director is Senior Assistant Commissioner How Kwang Hwee.

Structure
CID is led by a Director, currently SAC How Kwang Hwee, and 3 Deputy Directors.

There are a total of 8 divisions in CID, with each division led by an Assistant Director, namely:

 Operations, Investigation Policy Division
Operations Management
Operations Development
Liaison & Training Branch
Prosecution Branch
Research, Planning & Organisational Development Division
Specialised Crime Division
Specialised Crime Branch
Specialised Crime Policy Branch
Casino Crime Investigation Branch
Intellectual Property Rights Branch
Secret Societies Branch
Unlicensed Moneylending Strikeforce
Organised Crime Branch
Financial Investigation Branch
Major Crime Division
Special Investigation Section
Serious Sexual Crime Branch
Bomb & Explosive Branch
 Technology Crime Division
 Technology Crime Investigation Branch
 Technology Crime Forensic Branch
Technology Crime Policy Branch
Investigation Support & Services Division
Criminal Records
Specialised Interview
Corporate Services Branch
Manpower Branch
Quality Service Branch
CID Intelligence Division
Field Intelligence Branch
Intelligence Analysis & Processing Branch
Criminal Law Branch
Forensics Division
Forensics Management Branch

In popular culture 
In 2006, a police procedural series, C.I.D. was produced by Mediacorp, starring Tay Ping Hui, Qi Yuwu, Apple Hong, Jeanette Aw, Ong Ai Leng, Brandon Wong and Zhang Yaodong.

This was followed with a collaboration between the CID and Mediacorp in 2011, C.L.I.F., another police procedural series. The series lead to four sequels, C.L.I.F. 2, C.L.I.F. 3, C.L.I.F. 4 and C.L.I.F. 5.

See also
 Crime in Singapore

References

Singapore Police Force
Crime in Singapore